Timothy Cain may refer to:

 Tim Cain, American video game developer
 Timothy M. Cain (born 1961), American judge
 Major Timothy Cain, a character in the 2004 movie Resident Evil: Apocalypse

See also
Timothy Kain and Virginia Taylor